Sang Cheshmeh is a village in Chahardangeh Rural District, Chahardangeh District in Sari County, Mazandaran Province, Iran. At the 2006 census, its existence was noted, but its population was not reported.

References 

Populated places in Sari County